Dear World is a musical with a book by Jerome Lawrence and Robert E. Lee and music and lyrics by Jerry Herman. With its opening, Herman became the first composer-lyricist in history to have three productions running simultaneously on Broadway. It starred Angela Lansbury, who won the Tony Award for Best Leading Actress in a Musical in 1969 for her performance as the Countess Aurelia. It is not to be confused with Dear World, the popular photo series where people write meaningful messages on their skin.

Based on Jean Giraudoux's play The Madwoman of Chaillot as adapted by Maurice Valency, it focuses on the Countesses Aurelia, Constance and Gabrielle, who deviously scheme to stop businessmen from drilling for oil in the Parisian neighbourhood of Chaillot. The forces of idealism, love and poetry win over those of greed, materialism and science.

Productions and background
The musical had a notably troubled preview period that included multiple changes to the script and score. Lucia Victor, Gower Champion's assistant and a director of several revivals, including Hello, Dolly!, was hired as director, but resigned shortly thereafter, due to "artistic differences" with the musical's star, Angela Lansbury, and the authors, according to The New York Times. Peter Glenville was then hired, but resigned following negative reviews during tryouts in Boston, Massachusetts. Producer Alexander H. Cohen stated (in an article in The New York Times of November 19, 1968) that "there was no friction between Mr. Glenville and Miss Lansbury, the composer, the authors or the producer... an advance arrangement had been made with Mr. Glenville to direct the show through last week only." The show's final director, Joe Layton, was then hired, also replacing the choreographer Donald Saddler.

The musical opened on Broadway at the Mark Hellinger Theatre on February 6, 1969 and closed on May 31, 1969 after 132 performances and 45 previews. In addition to direction and choreography by Joe Layton, scenic design was by Oliver Smith, costume design was by Freddy Wittop and lighting design was by Jean Rosenthal.

Subsequent productions
Originally conceived as a chamber musical, Dear World fell victim to a massive production that effectively overwhelmed the simplicity of the original tale. After the Broadway closing, Herman, Lawrence, and Lee rewrote the show, "putting back the intimacy that had been undermined on Broadway."

A revised version was produced at Goodspeed Musicals (Connecticut) in November–December 2000, with Sally Ann Howes as Aurelia. This version had a revised book by David Thompson plus three songs written after the musical closed. A concert version was staged by 42nd Street Moon in San Francisco, September 6–24, 2000. This production used the revision by Herman, Lawrence and Lee.

A further revised version was produced at the Sundance Theatre (Utah) from June to August 2002 with Maureen McGovern playing Aurelia. Thompson had revised his previous revision of the book.

The Canadian premiere of this revised version was presented by the Toronto Civic Light Opera Company in May 2012. Directed by Joe Cascone, the production starred Barbara Boddy as Aurelia, David Haines as the Sewerman and featured Elizabeth Rose Morriss and Daniel Cornthwaite as the young lovers.

The musical had its UK premiere at London's Charing Cross Theatre from February 4 through March 16, 2013. The production was directed and choreographed by Gillian Lynne and starred Betty Buckley as Aurelia, Paul Nicholas as Sewerman and Stuart Matthew Price as Julian. Set design was by Matt Kinley, costumes by Ann Hould-Ward, lighting by Mike Robertson, musical direction by Ian Townsend, sound by Mike Walker, and orchestrations were by Sarah Travis.

The York Theatre Company (New York City) presented the musical from February 25 to March 5, 2017, starring Tyne Daly as Aurelia. Daly had previously starred in a concert version of Dear World at the Valley Performing Arts Center in Los Angeles on September 30, 2016. The concert featured Steven Weber as the Sewerman and Vicki Lewis and Bets Malone as Aurelia's friends.

Plot
A corporation has discovered oil under the streets of Paris, directly under a bistro. The Countess Aurelia (known as The Madwoman of Chaillot) lives in the bistro's basement, driven mad because of a lost lover and reminiscing about her past. When the corporation decides to blow up the bistro to get the oil, a young executive, Julian, helps to foil the plan because he has fallen in love with Nina, the bistro's waitress. Aurelia lures the corporation executives to the underground in the sewer system.

Songs (original score order)

Act I
 1. Overture - Orchestra
 2. Opening Scene - Orchestra
 3. "Through the Bottom of the Glass" - Countess Aurelia
 4. "Rain Reprise: Bottom of the Glass" - Countess
 5. Riverbank - Orchestra
 6. "Just a Little Bit More" - President, Prospector, Lawyer
 7. "Reprise: Just a Little Bit More" - President, Prospector, Lawyer
 8. "More" Playoff/Scene Change - Orchestra
 9. Chimes•Concertina Underscore #1 - Orchestra
10. Drowned Man - Orchestra
11. Chimes•Concertina Underscore #2 - Orchestra
12. "Each Tomorrow Morning" - Countess
13. "First Reprise: Each Tomorrow Morning" - Countess & Chorus
14. Chimes•Concertina Underscore #3 - Orchestra
15. "I Don't Want to Know" - Countess
16. "Second Reprise: Each Tomorrow Morning" - Countess, Julian
17. "I've Never Said I Love You" - Nina
18. Flea Market - Orchestra
19. Sewerman Scherzo - Orchestra
20. "Pretty Garbage" - Sewerman, Countess, Gabrielle, Constance
21. "Ugly Garbage" - Sewerman, Constance, Gabrielle
22. "Ugly Garbage Dance" - Sewerman & Company
23. "One Person" - Countess & Chorus

Entr'Acte
24. Entr'Acte - Orchestra

Act II
25. "The Spring of Next Year" - President, Prospector, Lawyer
26. Stoned Music - Orchestra
27. "Memory" - Constance
28. "Pearls" - Countess and Gabrielle
29. "Dickie" - Gabrielle & Countess
30. "Voices" - Constance
31. "Thoughts" - Countess
32. "Tea Party Trio" - Countess, Constance, Gabrielle
33. Ber-Ber Underscoring - Orchestra
34. "And I Was Beautiful" - Countess
35. "Beautiful" Playoff/Scene Change - Orchestra
36. "Dear World" - Julian & Company
37. Descent - "Reprise: The Spring of Next Year" - President, Prospector, Lawyer & Pimps
38. "Kiss Her Now" - Countess
39. Finale Ultimo - Countess & Company
40. Bows - Countess & Full Company
41. Exit Music - Orchestra

Songs (as revised)

Act I
"A Sensible Woman" – Aurelia †
"The Spring of Next Year"—The Chairman of The Board, The Prospector and The Corporation
"Each Tomorrow Morning"—Countess Aurelia and All
"I Don't Want to Know"—Countess Aurelia
"Just A Little Bit More"—The Chairman and the Corporation
"I've Never Said I Love You"—Nina
 "Just a Little Bit More" (reprise) – The Chairman of the Board and the Corporation †
"Garbage"—The Sewer Man, Countess Aurelia, Gabrielle, Constance and All
"Dear World"—Countess Aurelia, Julian and All

Act II
"Kiss Her Now"—Countess Aurelia
"Memories"—Constance
"Pearls"—Countess Aurelia and Gabrielle
"Dickie"—Gabrielle
"Voices"—Constance
"Thoughts"—Countess Aurelia
"And I Was Beautiful"—Countess Aurelia
"Have a Little Pity on the Rich"—The Sewerman †
"Each Tomorrow Morning" (Reprise)  Julian
"One Person"—Countess Aurelia and All
"Finale"—Company

† Added in the Goodspeed (2000) and Sundance (2002) versions

Characters and original Broadway cast
Countess Aurelia (The Madwoman of Chaillot) – Angela Lansbury
Gabrielle (The Madwoman of Montmartre) – Jane Connell
Constance (The Madwoman of the Flea Market) – Carmen Mathews
The Sewerman – Milo O'Shea
Julian – Kurt Peterson
The Chairman – William Larsen
Nina – Pamela Hall

Awards and nominations
Tony Award
Best Actress in a Musical – Angela Lansbury (winner)
Best Scenic Design – Oliver Smith (nominee)

Critical response
The show received mostly negative reviews. Time magazine called the songs "a total zero," while Martin Gottfried, noting that the plot line had been cut to ribbons, found "the story impossible to follow."

Walter Kerr wrote that the musical "is in the main quite charming...the actress [Lansbury]...is endearing throughout the evening and at her commanding best here." Her song "I Don't Want to Know" is "a song surprised by its own unexpected passion. The effect doesn't always work out for composer Jerry Herman...'Dear World' is attractive when it is staying close to its addled Good People...it is in trouble whenever it turns to the Bad People...Oliver Smith's settings are perfect."
Clive Barnes in The New York Times gave Lansbury a positive review: "The minor miracle is Miss Lansbury...no connoisseur of musical comedy can afford to miss Miss Lansbury's performance. It is lovely."

According to Steven Citron, "[Sally Ann] Howes and the majority of critics now believe that with a rewritten libretto it could be turned into a successful musical."

References

External links
 Internet Broadway Database listing

1969 musicals
Broadway musicals
Musicals based on plays
Musicals by Jerry Herman
Paris in fiction
Tony Award-winning musicals